Mark T. Gallogly (born 1957) is an American investor with a background in political and civic engagement. He co-founded and served as Managing Principal of the private investment firm Centerbridge Partners, until his retirement in 2020. Under the Obama Administration, he served on two Presidential advisory councils.

Early life and education
Gallogly was born on January 18, 1957, in Providence, RI to Florence E. (Giblin) Gallogly and Edward P. Gallogly. Gallogly is the eighth of eleven children. His parents were each the children of Irish immigrants and were first-generation college graduates. Gallogly’s father served as Lieutenant Governor of Rhode Island, United States Attorney for the District of Rhode Island and Chief Judge of the Rhode Island Family Court. Gallogly graduated with honors from the University of Notre Dame in 1979. As an undergraduate, he also studied at Sophia University in Tokyo. He received an MBA from Columbia Business School in 1986.

Career

Manufacturers Hanover Trust Company 
Gallogly spent his early career in the Acquisition Finance Group at Manufacturers Hanover Trust Company. He received his MBA at Columbia Business School through a professional development program offered by Manufacturers Hanover.

The Blackstone Group 
Joining in 1989, Gallogly was an early partner at The Blackstone Group. He was the head of private equity and served on the firm’s management and investment committees.

Centerbridge Partners
In 2005, Gallogly co-founded Centerbridge Partners with Jeff Aronson. The name of the firm originated with the concept of bridging Gallogly’s expertise in private equity and Aronson’s background in credit investing. Vision for the firm’s culture was expressed through its early recruiting procedures, which included hiring criteria such as trustworthiness and treating people with respect.

Centerbridge Foundation 
The Centerbridge Foundation was created in 2007 with a mission to increase access to educational and economic opportunities in the communities where Centerbridge Partners has offices. Leaders of grant partner organizations are invited to participate in professional development activities along with the heads of Centerbridge portfolio companies.

Three Cairns Group 
In 2015 Gallogly and his wife, Lise Strickler, founded Three Cairns Group, a social impact firm engaged in addressing the climate crisis through venture investing, philanthropy and public policy advocacy. Three Cairns Group’s work also includes a focus on equitable access to education, mental health services, and careers.

Community Involvement and Public Service

President’s Councils during the Obama Administration 
Gallogly was an early supporter of President Obama. He served on the President’s Economic Recovery Advisory Board, chaired by Paul Volcker, from 2008 to 2010, and the Council on Jobs and Competitiveness, chaired by Jeff Immelt, from 2010 to 2012. Gallogly was active on the regulatory reform working group of the Jobs Council.

Board seats and advisory councils 

 Vice-Chair of the Board of Trustees of Columbia University
 Columbia Business School Board of Overseers
 Columbia Climate School Board of Advisors
 Economic Club of New York Board of Trustees
 Partnership for New York City Board of Directors
 Member of the Advisory Council for the Hamilton Project, an economic policy initiative of the Brookings Institution
 Founding member of National Security Action’s Advisory Council, a foreign policy advocacy group
 Member of the Council on Foreign Relations

Personal life 
Gallogly married Lise Strickler, a climate and environmental advocate, in September 1987. Gallogly and Strickler met in the MBA program at Columbia Business School.  They have three daughters and reside in New York City.

References

 Mark Gallogly.  President's Economic Recovery Advisory Board

1957 births
American economists
American investment bankers
Columbia Business School alumni
Living people
Obama administration personnel
Private equity and venture capital investors
University of Notre Dame alumni